The Schaefer Music Festival in Central Park was a recurring music festival held in the summer between 1967 and 1976 at Wollman Rink in New York City's Central Park. It featured a number of notable performances. The sponsorship was taken over by Dr. Pepper in 1977 and the name changed to the Dr. Pepper Central Park Music Festival until the location of the festival was moved to Pier 84 in 1981 and the Wollman Skating Rink ceased being used as a concert venue.

History
The festival was sponsored by Rheingold Breweries until 1968, when the task was handled by F. & M. Schaefer Brewing Company. The cost of the annual music festival was about $500,000, and admissions, at $1 per person in 1968, were expected to bring in $250,000 to $270,000 for the summer program, leaving a deficit, picked up by Schaefer, of more than $200,000. "Until Schaefer decided to assume sponsorship, the prospect was that the ticket price [from 1967] would have to be doubled. The $2, [Commissioner of Parks August Heckscher] said, would have been 'too expensive for a lot of New Yorkers.'"

In the 1960s, before the rise of corporate concert organizers and ticket agents, top rated bands would often play for free (especially in San Francisco) or for amounts that resulted in reasonable concert ticket prices. Just before the Schaefer Music Festival kicked off in the summer of 1968 a free concert was given in Central Park featuring the Grateful Dead, Jefferson Airplane and the Paul Butterfield Blues Band, three of the top acts at that time. 6,000 people "jammed into the bandstand near the [Central Park] Mall while thousands more sprawled out on the grass and under the trees."

Club owner and musician Hilly Kristal co-founded the series with producer and concert promoter Ron Delsener. Over the years a Who's Who of superstars of the popular music scene performed there. Inexpensive tickets, which started at $1 in 1967 and rose to only $3 by 1976, further contributed to the event's popularity. While the capacity of the Wollman Rink was usually limited to about 6,000 to 7,000 people, it is reported that Bob Marley's performance in 1975 had attracted about 15,000 people.

In 1977, Dr. Pepper assumed sponsorship of the Central Park concert series, renamed the Dr. Pepper Central Park Music Festival. Due to residential noise complaints, this series was moved to Pier 84 on the West Side in 1981. The festival name was changed to Dr. Pepper Music Festival after the move away from Central Park in 1981. In 1983 Miller Brewing Company took over sponsorship with the name Miller Time Concerts on the Pier until 1988. In 1989 Reebok took over sponsorship of the concert series at Pier 84, renamed Reebok Riverstage, which lasted through 1990.

Good Vibrations from Central Park (1971) 
During the 1971 music festival, concerts on July 2 and July 3 were filmed for an ABC-TV special. The performers included Carly Simon, who made her TV debut, Ike & Tina Turner, Kate Taylor, Boz Scaggs, and the Beach Boys. Art Garfunkel and George Harrison also appear as non-performers. The concert aired as Good Vibrations From Central Park on August 19, 1971.

Festival line-ups

1967
 July 5: The Young Rascals; The Jimi Hendrix Experience; Len Chandler
 July 7: Phil Ochs

1968
 June 27: Count Basie Orchestra; Joe Williams 
 June 28: The Crazy World of Arthur Brown
 June 29: Moby Grape; Muddy Waters
 July 1: Mongo Santamaria; Hugh Masekela
 July 3: Mitch Ryder; Spirit
 July 5: Sarah Vaughan; Herbie Mann
 July 6: Nina Simone; The People's Choice 
 July 8: Ray Charles Orchestra & The Raelettes
 July 12: Pete Seeger; Len Chandler
 July 13: Montego Joe Septet; Sergio Mendes & Brazil '66
 July 17: Indrani's Indian Music & Dance Festival w/ Ali Akbar Khan
 July 20: (postponed from July 19) Indrani's Indian Music & Dance Festival w/ Ali Akbar Khan
 July 21: Indrani's Indian Music & Dance Festival w/ Ali Akbar Khan
 July 22: Chrysalis; Rosko (poetry); Theodore Bikel (filling in for Janis Ian)
 July 24: Vanilla Fudge; Ultimate Spinach
 July 26: Richie Havens; (Seals and Crofts?)
 July 27: Duke Ellington Orchestra
 August 1: B.B. King; Fats Domino
 August 3: Frank Zappa & The Mothers of Invention; Buddy Guy
 August 5: Lou Rawls; Joe Keyes
 August 7: The Who; Mandala
 August 9: George Shearing Quintet; Amanda Ambrose; Hal Waters
 August 10: Flip Wilson; Little Anthony & the Imperials
 August 12: Jimmy Smith; Gloria Lynne
 August 14: Joni Mitchell; Arlo Guthrie
 August 16: Tom Paxton; Patrick Sky
 August 17: The Chambers Brothers; Little Richard
 August 19: Traffic; Tim Buckley
 August 21: Country Joe and the Fish; Eric Andersen 
 August 23: Judy Collins
 August 24: Herbie Mann; Cal Tjader

1969
 June 26: Benny Goodman; Lionel Hampton
 June 27: Tiny Tim; Sweetwater
 June 28: The Crazy World of Arthur Brown; Rhinoceros
 June 30: Flip Wilson; Modern Jazz Quartet
 July 2: Jerry Lee Lewis; Pacific Gas & Electric
 July 5: Hugh Masekela; Willie Bobo
 July 7: Miles Davis; Thelonious Monk
 July 9: Blood, Sweat & Tears; Carolyn Hester
 July 11: Herbie Mann; Eddie Harris
 July 12: The Byrds; Chuck Berry; John Lee Hooker
 July 14: Jeff Beck; Orpheus
 July 16: Ten Years After; Fleetwood Mac; Spencer Davis Group
 July 18: Buffy Sainte-Marie; Cashman, Pistilli & West
 July 19: Cannonball Adderley; The Sweet Inspirations
 July 21: Led Zeppelin; B. B. King
 July 23: Joni Mitchell; Tim Hardin
 July 25: Mongo Santamaría; Cal Tjader; Ray Barretto; Chucho Avellanet
 July 26: Sly and the Family Stone; Slim Harpo
 July 27: Carlos Montoya; Paul Winter
 July 28: Paul Butterfield Blues Band; Jethro Tull
 July 30: Buddy Rich; Procol Harum
 August 1: The Beach Boys; Neil Young
 August 2: Frank Zappa & The Mothers of Invention; Buddy Guy
 August 4: Dizzy Gillespie; Carmen McRae
 August 6: Little Richard; The Checkmates, Ltd.
 August 8: Tom Paxton; Gordon Lightfoot
 August 9: Herbie Mann; Roy Ayers; Sonny Sharrock
 August 11: Arlo Guthrie; Melanie
 August 15: Al Kooper; James Cotton
 August 16: Lou Rawls; Carl Holmes and the Commanders; Ruth McFadden
 August 18: Nina Simone; Montego Joe
 August 22: Tim Buckley; Times Square
 August 23: Sam & Dave; Patti LaBelle & The Bluebelles

1970
 June 25: Ray Charles & The Raelettes
 June 27: Buddy Rich & Chase
 June 29: The Band
 July 1: Les McCann & Eddie Harris; Roberta Flack
 July 3: The Four Seasons
 July 6: Miles Davis Septet; Buddy Miles (Buddy Miles was replaced by Lee Michaels)

 July 8: Mongo Santamaría; Cal Tjader; Ray Barretto
 July 10: Tom Rush; Melanie
 July 13: Ike & Tina Turner; Carly Simon; The Voices of East Harlem
 July 15: Four Tops; Eddie Holman
 July 17: Stan Kenton; Four Freshmen; Chris Connor
 July 18: Little Richard; Wayne Cochran and the C.C. Riders
 July 20: Van Morrison; The Byrds
 July 22: Arlo Guthrie
 July 24: Great Speckled Bird; Ian & Sylvia; Tom Paxton
 July 25: La Lupe; Joe Bataan
 July 27: Peggy Lee
 July 29: John Sebastian; The Manhattan Transfer
 July 31: Iron Butterfly
 August 1: Dave Brubeck feat. Paul Desmond; Dakota Staton
 August 3: Jethro Tull
 August 5: Delaney & Bonnie feat. Duane Allman and Herbie Mann; Seals & Crofts
 August 7: Johnny Mathis
 August 8: The Impressions; Patti LaBelle & The Bluebelles
 August 10: Judy Collins
 August 12: The Supremes; The Meters
 August 14: The Everly Brothers; John Denver
 August 15: Sam & Dave; Jam Factory
 August 17: Mountain
 August 21: The Guess Who; Kathy McCord
 August 22: Fleetwood Mac; Bloodrock; Zephyr

1971
 June 24: Nancy Wilson; Thad Jones & Mel Lewis
 June 28: Buddy Rich; Chase
 June 30: The Band; Happy Traum; Artie Traum
July 2: Ike & Tina Turner; the Beach Boys; Kate Taylor; Boz Scaggs; Carly Simon (filmed for TV special)
July 3: Ike & Tina Turner; the Beach Boys; Kate Taylor; Boz Scaggs; Carly Simon (filmed for TV special)
 July 7: Mongo Santamaría; Herbie Mann; Roy Ayers
 July 9: Ravi Shankar
 July 10: Melanie; Janey & Dennis
 July 12: Ella Fitzgerald; Oscar Peterson
 July 14: The Supremes
 July 16: Poco; Jerry Riopelle
 July 17: The Byrds; JF Murphy and Salt
 July 19: Peggy Lee
 July 21: The Allman Brothers Band; Cowboy
 July 23: The Four Seasons; Jay and the Americans
 July 24: Cal Tjader; Willie Bobo; Joe Cuba
 July 26: Mary Travers
 July 28: Roberta Flack; Donal Leace
 August 2: Judy Collins
 August 4: Delaney & Bonnie; John Hammond
 August 6: Sha Na Na; The Voices of East Harlem
 August 7: Dave Brubeck feat. Gerry Mulligan / Paul Desmond, Chico Hamilton
 August 9: Kris Kristofferson; Janis Ian; Chris Gantry 
 August 11: Seatrain; Moby Grape
 August 13: Robert Klein; Tom Paxton; Bert Sommer; Tony Joe White; Bobby Gosh; Carol Hall; Jonathan Edwards
 August 14: Les McCann; Cannonball Adderley; Queen Esther Marrow
 August 16: Procol Harum; Mylon LeFevre
 August 18: Robert Klein; John Denver; Dion; Jackie Lomax; Bonnie Raitt; The Quinaimes Band
 August 20: Paul Butterfield Blues Band; James Cotton
 August 21: The Chambers Brothers; Mandrill
 August 23: Seals & Crofts; Earl Scruggs; Jerry Corbitt; The Charlie Daniels Band
 August 25: David Steinberg; Carly Simon
 August 27: The Five Satins; Screamin' Jay Hawkins; The Coasters
 August 28: Little Richard; The Orioles; The Harptones; The Jive Five

1972

 June 15: José Feliciano; Billy Joel
 June 17: Canned Heat; Dr. John the Night Tripper
 June 20: Badfinger; Kindred; Michael Gately
 June 23: Seatrain; Loggins & Messina; Chi Coltrane
 June 24: Melanie; Janey & Dennis
 June 30: Nina Simone; New York Rock & Roll Ensemble
 July 7: Billy Preston; Leo Kottke; The Strawbs
 July 8: Mandrill; Curtis Mayfield 7 p.m.; The Association / Jackie DeShannon 9:30 p.m.
 July 12: Edgar Winter; Blues Project
 July 14: Don McLean; Bill Withers
 July 15: The Chambers Brothers; James Cotton Blues Band
 July 17: B.B. King; Alex Taylor; Merry Clayton
 July 19: Sérgio Mendes & Brasil '77
 July 21: An Evening of Gold w/ The Four Seasons; Jay & The Americans
 July 22: Lighthouse; Five Dollar Shoes
 July 26: Arlo Guthrie; Harry Chapin
 July 28: J. Geils Band; Heads Hands & Feet
 July 29: J. Geils Band; Heads Hands & Feet
 July 30: Sha Na Na; Tiny Alice; Captain Beyond
 Aug. 2: Ella Fitzgerald; Herbie Mann
 Aug. 4: Bobby Darin; Ace Trucking Company
 Aug 5: Mahavishnu Orchestra; Taj Mahal
 Aug. 7: Savoy Brown; Malo
 Aug 9: Peggy Lee
 Aug. 11: Quicksilver Messenger Service; Bull Angus; Pure Food & Drug Act
 Aug. 12: Tom Rush; David Blue; Pamela Polland
 Aug. 14: Slade and Looking Glass played, Marc Bolan of T-Rex being ill.
 Aug. 16: Bette Midler; Gunhill Road; Moogy and the Rhythm Kings
 Aug. 18: Jim Dawson
 Aug. 19: Blood, Sweat & Tears; Chris Smither; Orphan
 Aug. 21: The Doors; Flo & Eddie
 Aug. 23: The Kinks; Orleans
 Aug. 25: Poco
 Aug. 26: Poco
 Aug. 28: James Gang; Ruth Copeland; David Bromberg
 Aug. 30: Richie Havens; Goose Creek Symphony
 Sept. 1: Ginger Baker; Buddy Miles
 Sept. 2: Ginger Baker; Buddy Miles

1973

 June 20: Bill Cosby; Little Anthony & the Imperials
 June 22: Blues Project Reunion; Roche Sisters
 June 23: Lee Michaels; Terry Reid
 June 25: King Crimson; Jo Jo Gunne
 June 29: Quicksilver Messenger Service; Malo
 June 30: The Chambers Brothers; Sons of Champlin
 July 6: Blood, Sweat & Tears; The Section
 July 7: John Sebastian
 July 9: Ruben and the Jets; Deodato; Calhoon (Mott the Hoople was originally scheduled to play on this date)
 July 11: Black Oak Arkansas; Mason Proffit
 July 13: Richie Havens; Jimmie Spheeris
 July 14: Rod McKuen
 July 16: Blue Öyster Cult; Andy Pratt
 July 18: Erroll Garner; Buddy Rich & Orchestra
 July 20: Frankie Valli & the Four Seasons; Jay and the Americans
 July 21: Marshall Tucker Band (Canned Heat and Wet Willie were originally scheduled to play on this date)
 July 23: Ray Barretto; Machito & Orchestra with Graciela; Willie Colón
 July 25: Sérgio Mendes & Brasil '77
 July 27: Judy Collins
 July 28: Cheech & Chong; Melissa Manchester
 July 30: B.B. King; James Cotton Blues Band
 August 1: TV Show, w/ the Eagles; John Sebastian; Sly and the Family Stone; The Temptations, and Melissa Manchester
 August 2: TV Show, w/ the Eagles; John Sebastian; Sly and the Family Stone; The Temptations, and Melissa Manchester
 August 3: José Feliciano; Leo Kottke
 August 4: Focus; Elephant's Memory (Leo Kottke was originally scheduled to play on this date)
 August 6: James Gang; Tim Buckley; Ralph McTell (7:30 PM show)
 August 6: Leslie West's Wild West Show w/ Mitch Ryder; Mitch Ryder & Band (10 PM show) (10cc was originally scheduled to play on this date)
 August 8: Helen Reddy; Robert Klein; Buzzy Linhart
 August 10: Mary Travers; Dion
 August 11: Wishbone Ash; Jimmy and Vella Cameron; Joe Walsh and Barnstorm (It's a Beautiful Day was originally scheduled to play on this date)
 August 13: Gladys Knight & the Pips; Blue Hare
 August 15: Earl Scruggs and Revue; David Bromberg; Doc Watson (The Everly Brothers were originally scheduled to play on this date, but they had split up in July)
 August 17: Mahavishnu Orchestra; Casey Kelly
 August 18: Mahavishnu Orchestra; Wet Willie (The Marshall Tucker Band was originally scheduled to play on this date)
 August 20: Robin Trower; Mark-Almond; Foghat
 August 24: Bonnie Raitt; Maria Muldaur; John P. Hammond
 August 24: Muddy Waters; Bobby Womack & Peace; Chick Corea
 August 27: Buffy Sainte-Marie; Chip Taylor
 August 29: Charlie Daniels; Sha Na Na (7 PM and 9:30 PM shows; Sha Na Na only at 9:30 show)
 August 31: Poco; David Blue
 September 1: Poco; David Blue 
 September 5: The Edgar Winter Group (The Eagles were originally scheduled to play on this date)
 September 7: Buddy Miles Express; The Incredible Bongo Band (Billy Preston and Labelle were originally scheduled to play on this date)
 September 8: Dave Mason

1974

 June 12: Benny Goodman and his Sextet
 June 14: The Original Righteous Brothers; Sam & Dave (7 PM and 9:30 PM)
 June 15: An Evening with Melanie (7 PM and 9:30 PM)
 June 17: James Gang; Maggie Bell; Duke Williams and the Extremes
 June 19: Steeleye Span, Bonnie Raitt w/ John Hall, Howdy Moon (John Sebastian was originally scheduled to play on this date)
 June 21: Two Generations of Brubeck: Dave Brubeck, Darius Brubeck, Chris Brubeck, Danny Brubeck; John P. Hammond
 June 22: Todd Rundgren's Utopia (w/ Special Guest Chaka Khan)
 June 24: Mahavishnu Orchestra
 June 25: Dionne Warwicke; Barry Manilow; Jane Olivor, likely billed then as Janie Olivor 
 June 28: Herbie Mann & The Family of Mann; Carlos Patato & His Bata Cubano; Joe Bataan
 June 29: Mandrill; Labelle
 July 1: King Crimson; Golden Earring
 July 8: ZZ Top; Brownsville Station
 July 10: Bobby Womack and Peace; Bloodstone; Minnie Ripperton (Earth, Wind & Fire was originally scheduled to play on this date)
 July 12: Robert Klein; Melissa Manchester; Jim Dawson
 July 13: José Feliciano; Freddie Prinze; Druick & Lorange
 July 15: Souther Hillman Furay Band; Leo Kottke
 July 17: America; Ian Matthews
 July 19: Linda Ronstadt; Martin Mull (Jesse Colin Young was originally scheduled to play on this date)
 July 20: Tom Rush; Janis Ian
 July 22: B.B. King; Bobby Blue Bland
 July 24: Harry Chapin
 July 26: Poco; Snafu
 July 27: Blood, Sweat & Tears, Tim Buckley
 July 29: Dave Mason; Premiata Forneria Marconi
 August 3: Anne Murray; Bruce Springsteen; Brewer & Shipley (Boz Scaggs was originally scheduled to play on this date)
 August 9: Uriah Heep; Manfred Mann
 August 10: David Bromberg
 August 12: Marshall Tucker Band
 August 17: Don McLean
 August 23: Peter Frampton; Snafu
 August 31: Premiata Forneria Marconi
 September 3: John Sebastian
 September 4: Foghat; Bad Company
 September 7: Rory Gallagher; Aerosmith

1975
 June 18: Bob Marley & The Wailers
 June 20: Journey
 June 21: Montrose; Leslie West; Thee Image
 June 25: Mirabai; Jim Dawson; Robert Klein
 July 2: Dave Mason; Pousette-Dart Band
 July 5: Blood, Sweat & Tears
 July 9: Bee Gees w/ Revelation
 July 14: The Marshall Tucker Band
 July 16: Three Dog Night
 July 21: Brownsville Station; Slade
 July 23: Hot Tuna
 July 27: James Gang; Peter Frampton
 July 28: Return to Forever: Chick Corea, Al Di Meola, Stanley Clarke, Lenny White
 July 30: Poco
 August 9: Judy Collins
 August 13: The J. Geils Band; Ruby Starr; Roomful of Blues
 August 16: The Charlie Daniels Band; Commander Cody and His Lost Planet Airmen
 August 22: Poco; Deadly Nightshade
 August 24: America
August 25: Utopia; Todd Rundgren
 August 27: CTI Summer Jazz; Grover Washington Jr., George Benson, Chet Baker, Bob James, Ron Carter, Hubert Laws, Hank Crawford, Joe Farrell
August 29: Aerosmith; Ted Nugent
 September 3: Uriah Heep
 September 5: Miles Davis 
 September 10: Jean-Luc Ponty
 September 12: Melissa Manchester; Barry Manilow
 September 13: John Sebastian; Lori Lieberman; California English
 September 14: Roy Buchanan; Forest Green; NRBQ

1976
 June 18: Gentle Giant; Starcastle
 June 19: Jesse Colin Young; Aztec Two-Step
 June 23: Atlanta Rhythm Section; The Charlie Daniels Band
 June 28: Flight; Sons of Champlin; Shakti & John McLaughlin
 July 3: Cheech & Chong; Utopia
 July 9: Patti Smith 
 July 12: B.B. King
 July 21: Donovan; Giba 
 July 26: Nils Lofgren; Rick Derringer
 July 30: Gerard; Kingfish feat. Bob Weir
 August 2: Grinderswitch; The Marshall Tucker Band
August 4: Harry Chapin
August 6: Sha Na Na
August 7: John Sebastian
August 9: Janis Ian; Leon Redbone
August 11: Robert Klein; D Movies
August 13: Natalie Cole
 August 14: John Hammond; The Cate Brothers; Outlaws
August 16:  Latin Night: Eddie Palmieri, Hector Lavoe & Orchestra, 
August 20: Arlo Guthrie
August 21: Chuck Mangione with Esther Satterfield
August 23: Santana; Robert Palmer
August 25: Santana;
August 27:  CTI Summer Jazz: Grover Washington Jr., Hank Crawford, Esther Phillips
August 28:  CTI Summer Jazz: Grover Washington Jr., Hank Crawford, Esther Phillips
August 30: Jimmy Cliff
 September 1: Diane Scanlon; Gary Wright; Frank Marino & Mahogany Rush; Johnny & Edgar Winter
 September 3: Foghat; Diane Scanlon
 September 4: David Bromberg; Vassar Clements
September 8: David Crosby; Graham Nash
September 10: David Crosby; Graham Nash
September 11: David Crosby; Graham Nash

1977 (Dr. Pepper Central Park Music Festival)

1984 (Miller Time Concerts on the Pier)

See also
List of historic rock festivals
List of blues festivals

References

External links
 RateYourMusic.com - List of Schaefer Music Festival performers

Music festivals in New York City
Rock festivals in the United States
Blues festivals in the United States
Recurring events established in 1967
Music festivals established in 1967
Pop music festivals in the United States
Jazz festivals in New York City
1967 establishments in New York City